Zinc finger protein 638 is a protein that in humans is encoded by the ZNF638 gene.

The protein encoded by this gene is a nucleoplasmic protein. It binds cytidine-rich sequences in double-stranded DNA. This protein has three types of domains: MH1, MH2 (repeated three times) and MH3. It is associated with packaging, transferring, or processing transcripts. Multiple alternatively spliced transcript variants have been found for this gene, but the biological validity of some variants has not been determined.

Interactions
ZNF638 has been shown to interact with FHL2.

References

Further reading

External links 
 

Transcription factors